Frank M. Reed was a member of the Wisconsin State Assembly.

Biography
Reed was born on February 19, 1861, in Necedah, Wisconsin.

Career
Reed was elected to the Assembly in 1902. Additionally, he served as Chairman (Similar to Mayor) of Necedah and Clerk of the School Board of Necedah. He was a Republican.

References

External links
The Political Graveyard

People from Necedah, Wisconsin
Mayors of places in Wisconsin
School board members in Wisconsin
1861 births
Year of death missing
Republican Party members of the Wisconsin State Assembly